Ángel López Jiménez (born 1955) is a Spanish astronomer. Working with Rafael Pacheco, he has discovered numerous asteroids. The Minor Planet Center may also refer to fellow astronomer Álvaro López-García when using "A. Lopez".

List of discovered minor planets 

Ángel López Jiménez discovered 58 minor planets.

See also

References

External links 
 Brief biography of Àngel López 

1955 births
Discoverers of asteroids

Living people
20th-century Spanish astronomers